Coma Witch is the seventh studio album by American metalcore band The Acacia Strain. It was released on October 14, 2014, through Rise Records. It is the band's first album to feature new guitarists Devin Shidaker and Richard Gomez, and the first album to not feature original guitarist Daniel "DL" Laskiewicz due to his departure from the band in May 2013. It is also the band's final album to feature bassist Jack Strong prior to his departure in May 2015.

History
On May 20, 2013, it was announced that original and longtime guitarist Daniel "DL" Laskiewicz would be departing the band. He was replaced by guitarists Devin Shidaker (ex-Oceano) and Richard Gomez (ex-Molotov Solution).

On January 13, 2014, the band announced they would begin recording their upcoming album in March, which would be produced by Will Putney from Fit for an Autopsy. The band completed recording the album on April 17.

On August 12, the band revealed the upcoming title of the album to be Coma Witch, which is set for release on October 14. The band also released the music video for the first single of the album, "Cauterizer".

Track list

Personnel

The Acacia Strain
Vincent Bennett – lead vocals
Devin Shidaker – lead guitar, programming, backing vocals
Richard Gomez – rhythm guitar
Jack Strong – bass
Kevin Boutot – drums

Production
Produced, Mixed & mastered by Will Putney
Engineered by Will Putney, Randy Leboeuf & Tom Smith, Jr
Editors: Randy Leboeuf & Tom Smith Jr.
Additional artists: Sven Avernus & Abra Bigham

References

2014 albums
The Acacia Strain albums
Rise Records albums
Albums produced by Will Putney